Gerould is a surname. Notable people with the surname include:

 Bobby Gerould, American sports announcer
 Daniel C. Gerould (1928–2012), American playwright
 Gary Gerould, American sports announcer
 Gordon Hall Gerould (1877–1953), American philologist and folklorist
 Katharine Elizabeth Fullerton Gerould (1879–1944), American writer

See also
 Gerould Wilhelm (born 1948), American botanist and lichenologist